Deadly China Doll also known as The Opium Trail is a 1972 Hong Kong action martial arts film written and directed by Huang Feng, produced by Raymond Chow, and starring Angela Mao.,

Synopsis

Pai Chen seeks revenge against Scarface Wu Hsu, who runs an opium smuggling ring. Hsu plans a drug deal which Pai plans to foil.

Cast

Angela Mao as Hei Lu
Carter Wong as Pai Chien
Ko Hsiang-ting

Reception

On October 3, 1973, it debuted at No.1 at the US Box Office.

References

External links

1972 films
1972 martial arts films
1970s action films
Films shot in Hong Kong
Golden Harvest films
Hong Kong action films
Hong Kong films about revenge
Hong Kong martial arts films
Kung fu films
Mandarin-language films
Films about opium
1970s Hong Kong films